Oenite is a mineral discovered in the Tunaberg Cu-Co-sulfide skarns, Bergslagen, Sweden, with the formula CoSbAs.

References 

minerals